Canindé may mean:

Geography
 Canindé, Ceará, a municipality in the state of Ceará, Northeast region, Brazil
 Canindé de São Francisco, a municipality in the state of Sergipe, Northeast region, Brazil
 Conceição do Canindé, a municipality in the state of Piauí, Northeast region, Brazil
 Cristinápolis, a municipality in the state of Sergipe, Northeast region, Brazil, and sometimes called Canindé de Cristinápolis
 Canindé River (disambiguation), any of several rivers with this name (in both Brazil and Ecuador)

Animals
 Canindé (goat), a Brazilian breed related to the Chué goat
 Blue-throated macaw (Ara glaucogularis, formerly Ara caninde)
 Blue-and-yellow macaw (Ara ararauna), which are sometimes called "" in Portuguese

Other
 Estádio do Canindé (Estádio Oswaldo Teixeira Duarte), a stadium in the Canindé neighborhood of São Paulo, Brazil
 Francisco Canindé Palhano, Bishop of the Roman Catholic Diocese of Bonfim since 2006
 Márcio Caetano Alves (b. 1980), a Brazilian football (soccer) player known as Canindé

See also 
 Canindé River (disambiguation)